The Fahnenstock (2,612 m) is a mountain of the Glarus Alps, located south of Weisstannen in the canton of St. Gallen.

References

External links
Fahnenstock on Hikr

Mountains of the Alps
Mountains of the canton of St. Gallen
Mountains of Switzerland